The Crest of the Peacock: Non-European Roots of Mathematics  is a book authored by George Gheverghese Joseph and published by Princeton University Press, the third edition of which was released in 2011. 
The book was brought out as a response to view of the history of mathematics epitomized by Morris Kline's  statement that, comparing to what the Greeks achieved, 
"the mathematics of  Egyptians and Babylonians is the scrawling of children just learning to write, as opposed to great literature", criticised by Joseph as "Eurocentric".

The book is divided into 11 chapters. Chapter 1 provides a lengthy justification for the book. 
Chapter 2 is devoted to a discussion of the mathematics of Native Americans and Chapter 3 to the mathematics of ancient Egyptians. The next two chapters consider the mathematics of Mesopotamia, then there are two chapters on Chinese mathematics, three chapters on Indian mathematics, and the final chapter discusses Islamic mathematics.

Plagiarism
C. K. Raju accused Joseph and Dennis Almerida of plagiarism  of his decade long scholastic work  that began in 1998 for the Project of History of Indian Science, Philosophy and Culture funded by the Indian Academy of Sciences concerning Indian mathematics and its possible knowledge transfer. An ethics investigation of the research team of George Gheverghese Joseph and Dennis Almeida led to the dismissal of Dennis Almeida by University of Exeter  and the University of Manchester posting an erratum and acknowledgement of C.K. Raju's work.

G. G. Joseph denies the charges.

Reviews
A review of the first edition of the book: 
A review of the book by European Mathematical Information Service: 
A review of the book by David Pingree: 
For a critical assessment of some of the claims and arguments of the author:

References

Books about the history of mathematics
Eurocentrism
Geocultural perspectives
Ethnocentrism
Books involved in plagiarism controversies
1991 non-fiction books
Princeton University Press books